Fat City Reprise was a five-piece rock band from South Philadelphia, Pennsylvania.

The name Fat City Reprise is derived from Hunter S. Thompson's failed bid for sheriff of Pitkin County, Colorado in 1970.

History

Formed in early 2003, Fat City Reprise's original line-up consisted of Frank Pedano (vocals, keys), Eric Cifone (drums), Nick Anastasi (lead guitar), Tony Trov (vocals, bass guitar), and Thomas J. Perko (vocals, guitar). The band gained notoriety by distributing live bootlegs of their own shows.

Under the line-up of Anastasi (guitars), Miraglia (drums), Pedano (lead vocals, keys), Perko (guitar), and Vivas (bass, background vocals), the band began working with Mike Lowe of Lowe Records. They recorded and released their debut album at Larry Gold's Studio, the self-titled Fat City Reprise in May 2007.  Halfway through the recording of the album, Perko departed.  Any tracks retaining his guitar playing are credited on the album artwork.  Lyrics and music are credited as "All songs by Fat City Reprise".

In February 2008, the Roots invited Fat City Reprise to perform at their Pre-Grammy party at the Key Club in Los Angeles where they performed with Patrick Stump, Seal, Travis Barker, MC Lyte, Doug E. Fresh, Bilal, Corinne Bailey Rae, and Travis McCoy of Gym Class Heroes. The band planned a West Coast Tour around the show and found so much success in California that they relocated from Philadelphia to Los Angeles.

In October 2009 Nick Anastasi and Michael Vivas left the band. Fat City Reprise's second studio album Pirate Radio was never released. The band officially ended with the departure of the last original member, Frankie Pedano, from Lowe Records in 2011.

Discography

Albums
 Live at Grape Street Pub – 2005
 Fat City Reprise – 2007

EPs
 Temple University Sessions – 2004
Cowgirl EP – 2005

References

External links
 Official website
 Fat City Reprise's Myspace
 Fat City Reprise's Label
 Fat City Reprise on Facebook

Indie rock musical groups from Pennsylvania
Musical groups from Philadelphia
Musical groups established in 2003
Musical groups disestablished in 2011